Olímpico Clube, commonly known as Olímpico, is a Brazilian football club based in Manaus, Amazonas state. They won the Campeonato Amazonense three times.

History
The club was founded on October 17, 1938. Olímpico won the Campeonato Amazonense in 1944, 1947, and in 1967.

Achievements

 Campeonato Amazonense:
 Winners (3): 1944, 1947, 1967

Stadium
Olímpico Clube play their home games at Estádio Parque Amazonense. The stadium has a maximum capacity of 12,000 people.

References

Association football clubs established in 1938
Football clubs in Amazonas (Brazilian state)
1938 establishments in Brazil